The 2001 Richmond Spiders football team represented the University of Richmond during the 2001 NCAA Division I-AA football season. Richmond competed as a member of the Atlantic 10 Conference (A-10), and played their home games at the University of Richmond Stadium.

The Spiders were led by seventh-year head coach Jim Reid and finished the regular season with a 3–8 overall record and 3–6 record in conference play.
The Spiders rush offense ranked eighth nationally, while its rush defense ranked seventh. Richmond's scoring defense finished 13th in the nation, while its total defense was ranked 11th.

Schedule

References

Richmond
Richmond Spiders football seasons
Richmond Spiders football